Villiers School is an independent coeducational Protestant day and boarding secondary school located on the North Circular Road, Limerick, Ireland.

History
Founded from the estate of Hannah Villiers in 1821, the school has a Protestant ethos and is managed by the Headmistress on behalf of the board of governors. The school relocated from Henry Street to its current location on the Tivoli campus on the North Circular Road less than one mile from Limerick city centre in 1953.

Notable former/current students and faculty

Donald Clarke, film correspondent for The Irish Times
David J. Cowpar, author (The ODDs Beginnings, Lee Kennedy: a Life Changing Friendship)
Max Dennison, Oscar-nominated special-effects artist
Daniel Ketchum, Olympic gold medalist at Athens, 2004
Aisling O'Loughlin, TV3 presenter
Jan O'Sullivan, Irish Minister for Education and Skills
Philip Owens, Los Angeles, California-based film editor
 Phoebe Prince
John Ruddock, Founder member of the National Concert Hall
Vere Wynne-Jones, RTÉ news and sports presenter
Samuel Walsh, artist; member of Aosdana

References

External links
 Official school website
 Satellite photo

Secondary schools in County Limerick
Educational institutions established in 1821
Private schools in the Republic of Ireland
Boarding schools in Ireland
Anglican schools in the Republic of Ireland
Protestant schools in the Republic of Ireland
1821 establishments in Ireland
Buildings and structures in Limerick (city)